Escadrille Nationale du Niger is the governmental airline of Niger based at Diori Hamani International Airport in Niamey.

Fleet

Current fleet
The Escadrille Nationale du Niger fleet consists of the following aircraft (as of August 2017):
 1 Boeing BBJ

Former fleet
The Escadrille Nationale du Niger fleet previously included the following aircraft (as of 19 July 2009) :
 1 Boeing 737-200

References

External links
 Escadrille Nationale du Niger (Niger National Squadron) (Niger), Military census.  Jane's Helicopter Markets and Systems, Jun 17, 2005.
 Escadrille Nationale du Niger Fleet

Airlines of Niger